Willema angolana is a species of butterfly in the family Hesperiidae. It is found in Angola, the Democratic Republic of the Congo (Shaba) and Zambia.

Subspecies
Willema angolana angolana - Angola, Zambia 
Willema angolana cooksoni (Druce, 1905) - Democratic Republic of the Congo (Shaba)

References

Butterflies described in 1896
Heteropterinae
Butterflies of Africa
Taxa named by Ferdinand Karsch